Kathputli (Puppet) is a 1971 Hindi-language romance film, produced and directed by Brij under the Dynamo International banner. It stars Jeetendra and Mumtaz Kalyanji Anandji composed the music.

Plot 
Nisha (Mumtaz) an employee and an orphan staying in a colony. Soon, Vishal (Jeetendra), another orphan, moves in next door. After a few comic incidents, they fall in love and couple up. A little later, their car has an accident and Vishal is wounded. He must be operated upon without delay, which requires Rs.5000. During that plight, Nisha approaches her lecherous boss (Manmohan) who exploits and molests her. So, after completion of Vishal's operation shattered Nisha attempts suicide and she is rescued by a wealthy woman, Roma (Helen), to whom Nisha spills the entire story. Roma consoles and reminds Nisha that Vishal needs her. Thereafter, Vishal slowly recovers when Nisha discovers herself pregnant. Hearing it, Roma addresses Nisha to her aunt Kamla Devi (Leela Mishra) at Delhi under the guise of training. Later, Nisha bears a son and bequeathing him she returns. After three years Vishal acquires his dream job and moves to Delhi where Nisha's past haunts her as her child Munna (Master Chicco) is being reared by Kamla's neighbor after her death. Eventually, she is the mother of Vishal's friend Murali (Jalal Agha), too, nevertheless, recognizing Nisha, the old lady maintains silence. Meanwhile, Vishal becomes cordial towards Munna and adopts him. One day, he discovers true parentage of Munna and abandons them. A distressed Vishal is supported by Roma.One day Munna leaves home in search of Vishal and comes across an accident who is hospitalised by Vishal. Moreover, Nisha's heinous boss blackmails her when an enraged Nisha kills him and she is apprehended. At the same time, Vishal learns the virtue of Nisha through Roma and drives back to the jail and accepts Munna as a father too. Finally, Nisha is acquitted and the movie ends with Vishal wholeheartedly accepting Nisha and Munna.

Cast 
Jeetendra as Vishal
Mumtaz as Nisha
Helen as Roma
Agha as Meenas father
Jalal Agha as Murali
Manmohan as Nisha's boss
Bhagwan chawl tenant
Malika as Meena 
Seema Kapoor as Party Dancer
Dilip Dutt as Muthuswamy
Fazloo
Bhola
Leela Mishra as Kamla Devi
Asha Chandra as Rosy
Praveen Paul as Murali's Mother
Kundan as Sunderlal awara
Master Chicco as Munna
Kumud Tripathi as Pandit Nalasoparakar

Soundtrack

References

External links 
 

1971 films
1970s Hindi-language films
1970s romance films
Films scored by Kalyanji Anandji
Indian romance films
Hindi-language romance films
Films directed by Brij Sadanah